The silver chimaera (Chimaera phantasma) is a species of fish in the family Chimaeridae found near Australia, China, Japan, North Korea, South Korea, New Caledonia, the Philippines, Taiwan, and Vietnam. Its natural habitat is open seas.

Silver chimaera got its name for the string patterns on the surface of its body, like a monster sewed up by different animal parts,  referring to a Greek mythic creature named chimaera (mythology), which combined lion with the  snake and goat. 
One of the fascinating features of Silver Chimaera is its teeth. Teeth are actually the skin derivatives, not just refer to hard stuff inside the mouth.  As for Chimaera fish, the male fish has three kinds of teeth, which grow by different organs respectively.

References

Chimaera
Taxa named by David Starr Jordan
Taxa named by John Otterbein Snyder
Fish described in 1900
Taxonomy articles created by Polbot